The 2009–10 CERS Cup was the 30th season of the CERS Cup, Europe's second club roller hockey competition organized by CERH. 28 teams from eight national associations qualified for the competition as a result of their respective national league placing in the previous season. Following a preliminary phase and two knockout rounds, Liceo won the tournament.

Preliminary phase 

|}

Knockout stage
The knockout stage consisted in double-legged series for the round of 16 and the quarterfinals, where the four winners would join the Final Four.

Final Four matches

Semifinals

Final

See also
2010–11 CERH European League
2010–11 CERH Women's European Cup

References

External links
 Roller Hockey links worldwide
 Mundook-World Roller Hockey
Hoqueipatins.com - Results from Roller Hockey

External links
 CERH website
  Roller Hockey links worldwide
  Mundook-World Roller Hockey

World Skate Europe Cup
CERS Cup
CERS Cup